Nakodar Assembly constituency is one of the 117 Legislative Assembly constituencies of Punjab state in India.
It is part of Jalandhar district.

Members of the Legislative Assembly

Election results

2022 
 

 

-->

2017

2012

See also
 List of constituencies of the Punjab Legislative Assembly
 Jalandhar district

References

External links
  

Assembly constituencies of Punjab, India
Jalandhar district